SS Politician is a compilation album, by the band Oi Polloi. It was released in 2010 on Skuld Records. Parts of the release are written in the Scottish Gaelic language. It includes the Mind The Bollocks EP, their side of the split with Israeli punk band Nikmat Olalim, a compilation track, and an extended version of SS Politician.

Track listing
 D.I.Y.
 A Whole New Ballgame
 Mutilation Of The Innocent
 Violation
 Òran Ball-coise
 Deiseil 's Deònach
 They Shoot Children
 Saorsa Do Vanunu
 Fuidachean 2006
 SS Politician (Extended Version)

2010 albums
Oi Polloi albums